Chak No. 291/E.B is a village of Burewala, Punjab, Pakistan situated on Jamlera Road. It is located at coordinate 30.102486N 72.846297E about 20 km away from the main city of Burewala. This village is 54 km away from district Vehari, and about 150 km away from its division Multan. It is a quite large village of Burewala Tehsil. It is known as Progressive Village in Tehsil Burewala. Daily, youth of many other villages went here for playing Floodlight Football Matches and also Kabaddi Matches.

Language
As per the national census of 1998 Punjabi language is the main language of Chak No. 291/E.B spoken by 94% population. Urdu language, the national language, is spoken widely while English spoken by the educated elite.

Facilities
 Govt. Boys High School
 Govt. Girls High School
 Govt. Hospital
 Union Council
 Post Office
 Religious Educational Institutions
 Private Schools (3 nos.)
 Jamal Agriculture Corporation
 Floodlight Football Ground

Castes

Arain 
Jutt
Rajput
Mahaar
 Others Kumhar, Julaha, Lohar, Cobbler and Dogar

Religion

 Islam almost 99.5% followers
 Christian almost 0.5% followers
 Five Mosques
 One Church

Agriculture

Mostly peoples having agriculture business here which is the backbone of the economy.

Main Crops
 Cotton
 Wheat
 Corn
 Rice
 Sugarcane

Vegetables
turnip, carrot, broad beans, eggplant, tomato, cucumber, onion, garlic, Red Chili, potato, Momordica charantia, pumpkin, white radish and spinach

Fruits
Mangoes, Oranges, Guava, Watermelon, Lemons, Jamun, Pomegranate, Peaches, Grewia asiatica

Geography and climate
The village of Chak No. 291/E.B is located in Punjab. The area around the village is a flat, alluvial plain and is ideal for agriculture, with many cotton , wheat and corn  fields. There is a canal that cut across the 291/E.B village, providing water from for agriculture. This makes the land very fertile. However, land close to the Sutleg river is usually flooded in the monsoon season.

291/E.B features an arid climate with very hot summers and mild winters. The village witnesses some of the most extreme weather in the country.

Gallery

Nearby villages 
 Chak No. 255/E.B Village of Be-Nazeer Bhutto (Late)
 Chak No. 257/E.B
 Chak No. 289/E.B
 Chak No. 299/E.B
 Chak No. 287/E.B
 Chak No. 269/E.B
 Chak No. 293/E.B
 Chak No. 295/E.B
 Chak No. 297/E.B
 Chak No. 281/E.B
 Chak No. 279/E.B
 Chak No. 283/E.B
 Chak No. 275/E.B
 Chak No. 267/E.B
 Chak No. 265/E.B
 Chak No. 203/E.B

References

External links
Burewala News Online
Tehsil Municipal Administration Burewala
Burewala News Online Urdu Page
Burewala Urdu News Online

Villages in Vehari District